is a Japanese ice hockey player for Toyota Cygnus and the Japanese national team. She participated at the 2015 IIHF Women's World Championship.

Shishiuchi competed at both the 2014 and the 2018 Winter Olympics.

References

1992 births
Living people
Ice hockey players at the 2014 Winter Olympics
Ice hockey players at the 2018 Winter Olympics
Ice hockey players at the 2022 Winter Olympics
Japanese women's ice hockey forwards
Japanese expatriates in Finland
Olympic ice hockey players of Japan
Asian Games medalists in ice hockey
Ice hockey players at the 2011 Asian Winter Games
Medalists at the 2011 Asian Winter Games
Asian Games silver medalists for Japan